Jodie Abacus is a British musician from Lewisham in South East London. His musical styles include R&B, soul, electronic and funk.

Career 
Jodie wrote "I’ll Be That Friend" in 2013 and uploaded it to his Soundcloud channel where it topped the Hype Machine charts and amassed over 100,000 plays. It was written while Jodie was in a dark point in his life, having caught life-threatening pneumonia and broken up with his long-term girlfriend at the same time. He subsequently signed a five-single deal with Household Records / Ministry Of Sound in early 2015.

Follow-up single "Good Feeling" was premiered by MistaJam on BBC Radio 1Xtra on 28 July 2015 and released on the same day. It was named Best of British Record of the Week on the BBC Radio 1Xtra Breakfast Show. It also received plays from Clara Amfo and DJ Target on BBC Radio 1, Tom Ravenscroft on BBC Radio 6 Music, and Trevor Nelson on BBC Radio 2.

His debut EP, titled "For Real Life And Not Pretend", was released on 26 February 2016. The single "She’s In Love With The Weekend" was released on 11 April 2016 and made it to the A-List on BBC Radio 2 

Abacus supported Jamie Woon on his European tour in April 2016 and Laura Mvula on three dates of her UK tour in May 2016. He followed these with a run of UK summer festivals including Glastonbury, Lovebox, Parklife, The Great Escape, V Festival, Secret Garden Party, and Y Not. His performance at The Great Escape was filmed by Vevo for their Vevo DSCVR series. He also performed at the main stage of the 9th Annual Roots Picnic in Philadelphia, opening for The Roots, Usher, and Anderson Paak.

The video for "I’ll Be That Friend" was released on 6 July 2016. It was shot in Los Angeles and was inspired by the video "People React To Being Called Beautiful" by Shea Glover Films.

On 4 September 2016, Jodie Abacus was the musical guest on the Channel 4 show Sunday Brunch. He supported Corinne Bailey Rae on her UK tour in October/November 2016. He recorded a live session for YouTube Music Foundry, where he performed "Keep Your Head Down", inspired by the Syrian refugee crisis. The song was released as a single on 9 December 2016.

Discography

Albums

Extended plays

Singles

References

Living people
British electronic musicians
Year of birth missing (living people)